Hyponephele pulchra, the tawny meadowbrown, is a butterfly species belonging to the family Nymphalidae. It is found in the Himalayas, from Chitral to Kumaon and in Kashmir.

References

pulchra
Fauna of Pakistan
Butterflies of Asia
Butterflies described in 1867
Taxa named by Baron Cajetan von Felder
Taxa named by Rudolf Felder